The 1957 Philippine presidential and vice presidential elections were held on November 12, 1957. Incumbent President and Vice President to Ramon Magsaysay, Carlos P. Garcia was elected for a full term as President of the Philippines. Garcia assumed the post following the death of Magsaysay in a plane crash earlier that year. His running mate, Speaker Jose Laurel Jr., lost to Pampanga Representative Diosdado Macapagal. This was the first time in Philippine electoral history wherein a president was elected by a plurality rather than a majority, and in which the winning presidential and vice presidential candidates came from different parties.

Results

President

Vice-President

See also
Commission on Elections
Politics of the Philippines
Philippine elections
President of the Philippines
4th Congress of the Philippines

External links
 The Philippine Presidency Project
 Official website of the Commission on Elections

1957
1957 elections in the Philippines